Yuldybayevo (Yuldıbay) is a rural locality (a village) in Abzanovsky Selsoviet, Zianchurinsky District, Bashkortostan, Russia. The population was 137 as of 2010. There are 5 streets.

Geography 
Yuldybayevo is located 58 km south of Isyangulovo (the district's administrative centre) by road. Petrovskoye is the nearest rural locality.

References 

Rural localities in Zianchurinsky District